Mariakerke is a village in the Belgian province of East Flanders. It is part of the urban area of the province's capital city Ghent. Its population is of 11,883 people (2007).

History 

In the 17th century, Mariakerke was divided in two because of the construction of the "Brugse Vaart", a canal that connects the cities of Ghent and Bruges. The west side is Mariakerke center. The east side of Mariakerke is known as Kolegem. Because of the hundreds of years of separation, both halves developed their own unique atmosphere.

Mariakerke obtained the status of independent village in 1793, after which a bridge was constructed to connect both halves of the village. The bridge has been destroyed several times during war, which makes that the actual bridge was put up in 1964.

Besides the bridge, Mariakerke only had one main road which connected the village with the city of Ghent. This road was very important for the village, and still exists today under the name "Brugse Steenweg".

Later in the 18th century, a trade route was constructed from Ghent to Eeklo, and Mariakerke became a stop along this important road. Nowadays the road is better known as the N9, one of Ghent's most busy avenues. This new street had a significant impact on the 18th century Mariakerke.

The people from Mariakerke became more involved in the city life of Ghent once the industrial era had begun. A lot of villagers found a job at the many factories of Ghent, and a lot of rich industrials constructed castles and mansions in the rural Mariakerke. These castles can still be visited today, and add a special atmosphere to the village.

Mariakerke finally lost its rural character after World War II. A lot of city people moved to the country side, and Mariakerke witnessed a real population boom. In the 1970s, the city of Ghent started expanding again, slowly but surely absorbing the village of Mariakerke into its urban borders. 1976 saw the fusion of Mariakerke with Ghent, and ever since it has been part of the urban area of Ghent.

Castles 
 Castle Claeys-Bouüaert
 Castle de Hemptinne
 Castle ter Beken
 Castle Kervyn d'oudt Mooregem
 Castle van Tieghem de ten Berghe
 White castle or Henri Story
 Castle les Cygnes

Kolegem
Kolegem is the eastern part of Mariakerke. Kolegem is separated from the rest of Mariakerke by a canal named Brugse Vaart, a canal between Ghent and Bruges. Some famous buildings in Kolegem are the former municipality house of Mariakerke (now containing only the administrative services), the Kollekasteel and the restaurant De Groene Staak.

References

Geography of Ghent
Populated places in East Flanders